Daylight saving time in Iran was the practice of setting the clock forward by one hour between the first day of Farvardin (21–22 March) in the Iranian calendar and the last day of Shahrivar (21–22 September), which has been observed during years 1978–1980, 1989–2005, and 2008–2022.

Abolishment 
In 2006, Iran abolished daylight saving time (DST); however, in September 2007, the Iranian parliament passed a law restoring DST starting from March 21, 2008, in spite of opposition by the contemporary government.

A number of deputies of The Eleventh Term of the Islamic Consultative Assembly of Iran drafted a plan to abolish daylight saving time in the country. This plan was approved by the Islamic Consultative Assembly of Iran on March 15, 2022. However, it was rejected by the Guardian Council due to it not clearly determining when this rule must be applied, and not clarifying if the Iranian government had authority to change it or not. After solving these ambiguities, it was confirmed to the Guardian Council, and then this plan was communicated to all Iranian ministries, organizations, and institutions by Iranian President Ebrahim Raisi on May 22, 2022. The abolition of daytime saving time was planned to be implemented on March 21, 2023.

However on September 21, 2022, Iran abolished daylight saving time effective immediately and now observes standard time year-round.

See also
Iran Standard Time
Daylight saving time

References

Time in Iran
Iran